Festuca glumosa is a species of grass in the family Poaceae. It is found in Ecuador and Colombia.

References

glumosa
Flora of Colombia
Flora of Ecuador
Near threatened plants
Taxa named by Eduard Hackel
Taxonomy articles created by Polbot